Yury Ivanov (born 1935) is a Soviet Olympic fencer. He competed in the team foil event at the 1956 Summer Olympics.

References

1935 births
Living people
Russian male fencers
Soviet male fencers
Olympic fencers of the Soviet Union
Fencers at the 1956 Summer Olympics